Enrique Duran Diaz is a Spanish professional football manager. Duran is currently the head coach of MLS Next Pro side Los Angeles FC 2.

Coaching career

Barcelona
Durán was born in Barcelona and began coaching FC Barcelona youth teams in 2005. He continued with FCB Escola, leading workshops in Saudi Arabia, China, England, Ireland, Bangladesh, Korea and Japan.

South Africa

In 2011 he became Technical Director at South African club, Mamelodi Sundowns, developing youth players such as Keagan Dolly and Lunathi Mdatyulwa.

Durán returned to Spain in 2015 to complete his Master's degree at The Cruyff Institute and subsequently began to work with Cruyff Football as a project manager, promoting the Cruyff brand and methodology.

United States

Los Angeles FC
In 2017 Duran was announced as Director of Coaching at Los Angeles FC Academy where he won the 2018 CONCACAF Under-13 Champions League and Manchester City Cup.

Las Vegas Lights FC
Durán initially worked as an assistant to Head Coach Steve Cherundolo prior to being announced as the head coach for the Las Vegas Lights FC ahead of the 2022 USL Championship season. His first game in charge was a 2–0 loss to New Mexico United.

Los Angeles FC 2
Durán was announced as the inaugural head coach of new MLS Next Pro side Los Angeles FC 2 on January 25, 2023.

References

Living people
Spanish football managers
Las Vegas Lights FC coaches
1981 births
FC Barcelona non-playing staff
Mamelodi Sundowns F.C.
Los Angeles FC non-playing staff
USL Championship coaches
Sportspeople from Barcelona
Spanish expatriate sportspeople in South Africa
Spanish expatriate sportspeople in the United States
Expatriate soccer managers in the United States
Spanish expatriate football managers